Sabtang, officially the Municipality of Sabtang, is a 6th class municipality in the province of Batanes, Philippines. According to the 2020 census, it has a population of 1,696 people.

The southernmost island municipality of the Batanes island group, Sabtang comprises primarily Sabtang Island, as well as two nearby smaller and uninhabited islands: Ivuhos and Dequey. The municipality is known for its lighthouse and the old stone houses of the Ivatan villages of Chavayan and Savidug. Like Batan Island to the north, Sabtang also has a few Mission-style churches and white sand beaches.

History

The Spanish missionary Fr. Artiquez first visited the Island of Sabtang in 1786 after receiving an affirmative response from the island to learn about the Christian faith. The success of the first visit led to two more evangelical trips resulting in the baptism of 181 children and the study of the catechism among the adult natives. The evangelization of Sabtang was cut short due to the failing health of the Spanish missionaries. For this, the inhabitants of Sabtang remained faithful to old traditions especially in the administration of justice by vendetta and murder.

In 1791, the then most powerful chief in Sabtang named Aman Dangat showed defiance of the government of Governor Joaquin del Castillo by killing the Spanish soldiers who went to Sabtang to procure supplies. Lieutenant Tomas Nuñez led the troops to capture the rebels. Aman Dangat was put to trial and admitted to the crime. He, later on, asked to be baptized. The inhabitants of Sabtang were then forced to resettle in San Vicente and San Felix in Ivana to be better supervised by the government.

Some forty years after the resettlement, the Sabteños were allowed to visit their native island and gradually these visits allowed them to build homes in their erstwhile land. The government allowed this to happen on the condition that houses should be constructed in lowlands. To sustain the spiritual care for the Sabteños, a new mission was opened in Sabtang in 1845 under the patronage of Saint Vincent Ferrer with Fr. Antonio Vicente as its first vicar. Fr. Antonio Vicente is credited to have built the Sabtang Church, together with a convent, a school, and a courthouse.

Geography

According to the Philippine Statistics Authority, the municipality has a land area of  constituting  of the  total area of Batanes.

Barangays
Sabtang is politically subdivided into 6 barangays. These barangays are headed by elected officials: Barangay Captain, Barangay Council, whose members are called Barangay Councilors. All are elected every three years.

Climate

Demographics

In the 2020 census, Sabtang had a population of 1,696.

Economy

Government
Sabtang, belonging to the lone congressional district of the province of Batanes, is governed by a mayor designated as its local chief executive and by a municipal council as its legislative body in accordance with the Local Government Code. The mayor, vice mayor, and the councilors are elected directly by the people through an election which is being held every three years.

Elected officials

Education
The Schools Division of Batanes governs the town's public education system. The division office is a field office of the DepEd in Cagayan Valley region. The office governs the public and private elementary and public and private high schools throughout the municipality.

Gallery

References

External links

 [ Philippine Standard Geographic Code]

Municipalities of Batanes
Island municipalities in the Philippines